Md Mujibul Haque Chunnu (born 1 September 1953) is a Jatiya Party politician and the  current Secretary General of the party. He is the incumbent Jatiya Sangsad member representing the Kishoreganj-3 constituency since 2009. He served as the State Minister of Labour and Employment during 2014–2019.

Early life 
Haque was born on 1 September 1953 to Abdul Malek and Harunnessa in Kajala Madhyapara, Tarail Upazila, Kishoreganj District, East Bengal, Pakistan. He completed his SSC in 1970 and HSC in 1972. He was a member of the Mukti Bahini and fought in the Bangladesh Liberation war in Sector-11. In 1980, he graduated from the University of Dhaka with a law degree and a master's degree in 1981.

Career
Haque was elected president of the Kishoreganj District unit of Jatiya Party. He was elected to parliament as a candidate of Jatiya Party from Kishoreganj-4 in 1986. He was re-elected in 1988. From August 1987 to 1988, he served as the Deputy Minister of Land. He was elected to parliament again in 2008, 2014 and 2018. From 21 November 2013 to 12 January 2014, he was the State Minister of Youth and Sports. Then he served as the State Minister of Labor and Employment during 2014–2019.

Upon the death of Ziauddin Ahmed Bablu, Haque was appointed as the Secretary General of Jatiya Party in October 2021.

Personal life
Haque is married to Rokhsana Kader. Together they have two sons, Ziaul Haque and Israrul Haque.

References

Living people
1953 births
People from Kishoreganj District
University of Dhaka alumni
Bangladesh Jatiya Party politicians
State Ministers of Youth and Sports (Bangladesh)
State Ministers of Labour and Employment (Bangladesh)
3rd Jatiya Sangsad members
4th Jatiya Sangsad members
9th Jatiya Sangsad members
10th Jatiya Sangsad members
11th Jatiya Sangsad members